Hypena namaqualis is a moth of the family Erebidae. It was described by Achille Guenée in 1854. It is found in South Africa.

References

Moths described in 1854
namaqualis